Salghari is a village in Sankhar village development committee Ward No-5, Syangja District, Gandaki Province, Nepal. According to the 2011 Nepal census, held by Central Bureau of Statistics, it had a total population of 41. There are 20 males and 21 females living in 12 households.

References

External links 
MeroSyangja.Com
District Development Committee, Syangja

Populated places in Syangja District
Syangja District